Appias lalassis, the Burmese Puffin, is a butterfly in the family Pieridae.It was described by Henley Grose-Smith in 1887. It is found in the Indomalayan realm.

Subspecies
Appias lalassis lalassis (southern Burma, Thailand, southern Yunnan)
Appias lalassis indroides (Honrath, [1890]) (Peninsular Malaysia)

References

External links
Appias at Markku Savela's Lepidoptera and Some Other Life Forms

Appias (butterfly)
Butterflies described in 1887